Edward Uschold is an American college baseball coach at Missouri Baptist University in St. Louis, Missouri.

References

External links
 Missouri Baptist profile

Year of birth missing (living people)
Living people
Kent State Golden Flashes baseball coaches
Tyler Apaches baseball coaches
Manchester Spartans baseball coaches
Olivet Comets baseball coaches
Missouri Baptist Spartans baseball coaches